Timema genevievae, or Genevieve's timema, is a species of walkingstick in the family Timematidae. It is found in North America.

References

Phasmatodea
Articles created by Qbugbot
Insects described in 1978